The following lists events that happened during 1868 in South Africa.

Incumbents
 Governor of the Cape of Good Hope and High Commissioner for Southern Africa: Sir Philip Wodehouse.
 Lieutenant-governor of the Colony of Natal: Robert William Keate.
 State President of the Orange Free State: Jan Brand.
 State President of the South African Republic: Marthinus Wessel Pretorius.

Events
March
 12 – Basutoland is proclaimed a British Protectorate.

Unknown date
 The Koranna War breaks out along the Orange River.

Births

Deaths

References

South Africa
Years in South Africa
History of South Africa